Li Lei (born 25 July 1995) is a Chinese footballer who plays for Guangzhou R&F.

Club career
Li Lei started his professional football career in August 2016 when he was loaned to Hong Kong Premier League side R&F, which was the satellite team of Guangzhou R&F. He made his senior debut on 18 September 2016 in the 2016–17 Hong Kong Senior Challenge Shield against BC Glory Sky. His league debut came on 24 September 2016 in a 2–0 away defeat against BC Glory Sky.

Career statistics 
 

1League Cups include Hong Kong Senior Challenge Shield, Hong Kong League Cup and Hong Kong Sapling Cup.

References

1995 births
Living people
Chinese footballers
Footballers from Inner Mongolia
Guangzhou City F.C. players
R&F (Hong Kong) players
Association football defenders
Hong Kong Premier League players